The U.S. state of New York currently comprises 26 congressional districts. Each district elects one member of the United States House of Representatives who sits on its behalf. The state was redistricted in 2022, following the 2020 U.S. census; it lost one seat in Congress.

The loss of a congressional seat was decided by a remarkably close margin in the census count; it was believed that if 89 more people were counted in the census results and all other state populations remained stagnant, New York would have kept its lost seat.

Current districts and representatives
List of members of the United States House delegation from New York, district boundaries, and district political ratings, according to the CPVI. The delegation has a total of 26 members, with fifteen Democrats and eleven Republicans, as of 2023.

Historical district locations 

Note: There are now 62 counties in New York (state). The counties that are not mentioned in this list had not yet been established, or sufficiently organized.

1789 elections 

On January 27, 1789, the New York State Legislature divided the State of New York into six congressional districts which were not numbered.

 Kings, Queens, Richmond and Suffolk counties.
 New York City, and Westchester County except the towns of Salem, North Salem, Cortland, Yorktown and Stephentown.
 Dutchess County and the abovementioned towns in Westchester.
 Orange and Ulster counties.
 Albany County east of the Hudson River, Columbia, Clinton and Washington counties.
 Albany County west of the Hudson River, and Montgomery and Ontario counties.

1790 elections 

The districts remained the same as for the previous elections in March 1789.

1793 elections 

On December 18, 1792, the Legislature divided the State into ten districts, which were still not numbered, taking into account the new counties created in 1791.
 Kings, Queens and Suffolk counties.
 New York County.
 Westchester and Richmond counties.
 Orange and Ulster counties.
 Dutchess County.
 Columbia County.
 Clinton and Rensselaer counties.
 Albany County.
 Washington and Saratoga counties.
 Montgomery, Ontario, Herkimer, Otsego and Tioga counties.

1794 elections 

The congressional districts remained at this election the same as at the previous election, only inside the tenth district a new county, Onondaga, was created in 1794.
 Kings, Queens and Suffolk counties.
 New York County.
 Westchester and Richmond counties.
 Orange and Ulster counties.
 Dutchess County.
 Columbia County.
 Clinton and Rensselaer counties.
 Albany County.
 Washington and Saratoga counties.
 Montgomery, Ontario, Herkimer, Otsego, Tioga and Onondaga counties.

1796 elections 

The geographical area of the congressional districts remained at this election the same as at the previous election in December 1794. Steuben county was created out of part of Ontario County, and remained in the same district. Schoharie County was created from part of Albany County, and part of Otsego County, which remained in separate districts. 
 Kings, Queens and Suffolk counties.
 New York County.
 Westchester and Richmond counties.
 Orange and Ulster counties.
 Dutchess County.
 Columbia County.
 Clinton and Rensselaer counties.
 Albany County and part of Schoharie County.
 Washington and Saratoga counties.
 Montgomery, Ontario, Herkimer, Otsego, Tioga, Onondaga and Steuben counties, and part of Schoharie County.

1798 elections 

On March 27, 1797, the Legislature re-apportioned the districts, taking into account the new counties which had been created in the meanwhile, and for the first time the districts were numbered.

 : Kings, Queens, Suffolk and Richmond counties.
 : The first six wards of New York County.
 : The 7th Ward of New York County, and Westchester and Rockland counties.
 : Orange, Ulster and Delaware counties.
 : Dutchess County.
 : Columbia and Rensselaer counties.
 : Clinton, Saratoga and Washington counties.
 : Albany and Schoharie counties.
 : Herkimer, Montgomery, Chenango and Oneida counties.
 : Ontario, Otsego, Tioga, Onondaga and Steuben counties.

1800 elections 

The districts remained the same as at the previous election in April 1798, but two new counties were created in 1799: in the 7th district, Essex County was split from Clinton County; and in the 10th district, Cayuga County was split from Onondaga County.

 : Kings, Queens, Suffolk and Richmond counties.
 : The first six wards of New York County.
 : The 7th Ward of New York County, and Westchester and Rockland counties.
 : Orange, Ulster and Delaware counties.
 : Dutchess County.
 : Columbia and Rensselaer counties.
 : Clinton, Saratoga, Washington and Essex counties.
 : Albany and Schoharie counties.
 : Herkimer, Montgomery, Chenango and Oneida counties.
 : Ontario, Otsego, Tioga, Onondaga, Steuben and Cayuga counties.

1802 elections 

Until the previous elections, there had been ten congressional districts. After the U.S. census of 1800, Congress re-apportioned the seats, and New York's representation was increased to 17. On March 30, 1802, the New York State Legislature re-apportioned the congressional districts, dividing New York County seemingly at random into two districts.

 : Queens and Suffolk counties.
 : The 1st, 2nd, 3rd and 5th Ward of New York County; and Kings and Richmond counties.
 : The 4th, 6th and 7th Ward of New York County.
 : Westchester and Rockland counties.
 : Orange County.
 : Dutchess County.
 : Ulster and Greene counties.
 : Columbia County.
 : Albany County.
 : Rensselaer County.
 : Clinton, Saratoga and Essex counties.
 : Washington County.
 : Montgomery and Schoharie counties.
 : Delaware and Otsego counties.
 : Herkimer and Oneida counties.
 : Chenango, Tioga and Onondaga counties.
 : Ontario, Steuben and Cayuga counties.

1804 elections 

After the election of one Democratic-Republican and one Federalist in 1802, the Democratic-Republican majority in the State Legislature gerrymandered the two districts together in an Act passed on March 20, 1804, so that two congressmen would be elected on a general ticket by the voters of both districts, assuring the election of two Democratic-Republicans.

Besides, Seneca County was split from Cayuga County inside the 17th district.

 : Queens and Suffolk counties.
 : Westchester and Rockland counties.
 : Orange County.
 : Dutchess County.
 : Ulster and Greene counties.
 : Columbia County.
 : Albany County.
 : Rensselaer County.
 : Clinton, Saratoga and Essex counties.
 : Washington County.
 : Montgomery and Schoharie counties.
 : Delaware and Otsego counties.
 : Herkimer and Oneida counties.
 : Chenango, Tioga and Onondaga counties.
 : Ontario, Steuben, Cayuga and Seneca counties.

1806 elections 

Three new counties had been created since the last elections in 1804: inside the 15th district, Jefferson County was split off from Oneida County; in the 16th district, Madison County from Chenango County; and in the 17th district, Allegany County from Genesee County The area of the districts remained the same.

 : Queens and Suffolk counties.
 : Westchester and Rockland counties.
 : Orange County.
 : Dutchess County.
 : Ulster and Greene counties.
 : Columbia County.
 : Albany County.
 : Rensselaer County.
 : Clinton, Saratoga and Essex counties.
 : Washington County.
 : Montgomery and Schoharie counties.
 : Delaware and Otsego counties.
 : Herkimer, Oneida and Jefferson counties.
 : Chenango, Tioga, Onondaga and Madison counties.
 : Ontario, Steuben, Cayuga, Seneca and Allegany counties.

1808 elections 

On April 8, 1808, the State Legislature re-apportioned the districts again, separating the 2nd and the 3rd district, and creating two districts with two seats each to be filled on a general ticket: the 2nd and the 6th.

David Thomas had been elected in the old 12th district which had comprised only Washington County, so the vacancy was filled by a special election held only in this county, while at the same time two representatives were elected on a general ticket in the new 6th district to which Washington County had been re-districted together with Columbia County and Rensselaer County.

Due to the double-seat districts, there were then only 15 districts; the 16th and 17th were eliminated.

 : Kings, Queens and Suffolk counties.
  (two seats): New York, Richmond and Rockland counties.
 : Orange and Westchester counties.
 : Dutchess County.
 : Ulster, Greene counties.
  (two seats): Columbia, Rensselaer and Washington counties.
 : Albany County.
 : Clinton, Saratoga and Essex counties.
 : Montgomery and Schoharie counties.
 : Herkimer, St. Lawrence, Jefferson and Lewis counties.
 : Oneida and Madison counties.
 : Delaware and Otsego counties.
 : Chenango, Onondaga, Broome and Cortland counties.
 : Tioga, Steuben, Cayuga and Seneca counties.
 : Ontario, Genesee and Allegany counties.

Note: There are now 62 counties in the State of New York. The counties which are not mentioned in this list had not yet been established, or sufficiently organized, the area being included in one or more of the above-mentioned counties.

1810 elections 

The districts remained the same as at the previous elections in 1808. Only four new counties were created inside some districts: in the 5th district, Sullivan County was split from Ulster County; in the 7th district, Schenectady County was split from Albany County; in the 8th district, Franklin County was split from Clinton County; and in the 15th district, Niagara County was split from Genesee County.

 : Kings, Queens and Suffolk counties.
  (two seats): New York, Richmond and Rockland counties.
 : Orange and Westchester counties.
 : Dutchess County.
 : Ulster, Greene and Sullivan counties.
  (two seats): Columbia, Rensselaer and Washington counties.
 : Albany and Schenectady counties.
 : Clinton, Saratoga, Essex and Franklin counties.
 : Montgomery and Schoharie counties.
 : Herkimer, St. Lawrence, Jefferson and Lewis counties.
 : Oneida and Madison counties.
 : Delaware and Otsego counties.
 : Chenango, Onondaga, Broome and Cortland counties.
 : Tioga, Steuben, Cayuga and Seneca counties.
 : Ontario, Genesee, Allegany and Niagara counties.

1812 elections 

Due to the increase in seats, the previously eliminated 16th and 17th district were re-established, and four more districts were created. Six districts had two members, elected districtwide on a general ticket.

  (two seats): The 1st and 2nd Ward of New York County, and Kings, Queens, Suffolk and Richmond counties.
  (two seats): The other eight wards of New York County.
 : Westchester and Rockland counties.
 : Dutchess County, except the towns of Rhinebeck and Clinton; and Putnam County.
 : Columbia County; and Rhinebeck and Clinton in Dutchess County.
 : Orange County.
 : Ulster and Sullivan counties.
 : Delaware and Greene counties.
 : Albany County.
 : Rensselaer County.
 : Saratoga County.
  (two seats): Clinton, Essex, Franklin and Washington counties.
 : Schenectady and Schoharie counties.
 : Montgomery County.
  (two seats): Chenango, Broome and Otsego counties.
 : Oneida County.
 : Herkimer and Madison counties.
 : St. Lawrence, Jefferson and Lewis counties.
 : Onondaga and Cortland counties.
  (two seats): Tioga, Steuben, Cayuga and Seneca counties.
  (two seats): Ontario, Genesee, Allegany, Niagara and Chautauqua counties.

1814 elections 

For the 1814 elections, the districts remained the same as at the previous elections in 1812, only one new county was created: in the 12th district, Warren County was split from Washington County.

  (two seats): The 1st and 2nd Ward of New York County, and Kings, Queens, Suffolk and Richmond counties.
  (two seats): The other eight wards of New York County.
 : Westchester and Rockland counties.
 : Dutchess County, except the towns of Rhinebeck and Clinton; and Putnam County.
 : Columbia County; and Rhinebeck and Clinton in Dutchess County.
 : Orange County.
 : Ulster and Sullivan counties.
 : Delaware and Greene counties.
 : Albany County.
 : Rensselaer County.
 : Saratoga County.
  (two seats): Clinton, Essex, Franklin, Washington and Warren counties.
 : Schenectady and Schoharie counties.
 : Montgomery County.
  (two seats): Chenango, Broome and Otsego counties.
 : Oneida County.
 : Herkimer and Madison counties.
 : St. Lawrence, Jefferson and Lewis counties.
 : Onondaga and Cortland counties.
  (two seats): Tioga, Steuben, Cayuga and Seneca counties.
  (two seats): Ontario, Genesee, Allegany, Niagara and Chautauqua counties.

1816 elections 

For the 1816 elections, there was no change.

1818 elections 

For the 1818 elections, the geographical area of the districts remained the same as at the previous elections in 1816. Two new counties were created: Tompkins inside the 20th district; and Cattaraugus inside the 21st district. In 1817, the Town of Danube was separated from the Town of Minden in Montgomery County, and transferred to Herkimer County, but Danube remained in the 14th district.

  (two seats): The 1st and 2nd Ward of New York County, and Kings, Queens, Suffolk and Richmond counties.
  (two seats): The other eight wards of New York County.
 : Westchester and Rockland counties.
 : Dutchess County, except the towns of Rhinebeck and Clinton; and Putnam County.
 : Columbia County; and Rhinebeck and Clinton in Dutchess County.
 : Orange County.
 : Ulster and Sullivan counties.
 : Delaware and Greene counties.
 : Albany County.
 : Rensselaer County.
 : Saratoga County.
  (two seats): Clinton, Essex, Franklin, Washington and Warren counties.
 : Schenectady and Schoharie counties.
 : Montgomery County and the Town of Danube in Herkimer County.
  (two seats): Chenango, Broome and Otsego counties.
 : Oneida County.
 : Herkimer County, except the Town of Danube, and Madison County.
 : St. Lawrence, Jefferson and Lewis counties.
 : Onondaga and Cortland counties.
  (two seats): Tioga, Steuben, Cayuga, Seneca and Tompkins counties.
  (two seats): Ontario, Genesee, Allegany, Niagara, Chautauqua and Cattaraugus counties.

1821 elections 

For the 1821 elections, except for the split of the 21st district, the geographical area of the congressional districts remained the same as at the previous elections in 1818. Five new counties had been created. Hamilton County was split from Montgomery County inside the 14th district. Oswego County was created from parts of Oneida and Onondaga counties, but the parts remained in their previous congressional districts. On March 9, 1821, the New York State Legislature divided the 21st district in two districts: Ontario County and the newly created Monroe County remained as the 21st district; the remainder became the new 22nd district, including the new counties of Erie and Livingston.

  (two seats): The 1st and 2nd Ward of New York County, and Kings, Queens, Suffolk and Richmond counties.
  (two seats): The other eight wards of New York County.
 : Westchester and Rockland counties.
 : Dutchess County, except the towns of Rhinebeck and Clinton; and Putnam County.
 : Columbia County; and Rhinebeck and Clinton in Dutchess County.
 : Orange County.
 : Ulster and Sullivan counties.
 : Delaware and Greene counties.
 : Albany County.
 : Rensselaer County.
 : Saratoga County.
  (two seats): Clinton, Essex, Franklin, Washington and Warren counties.
 : Schenectady and Schoharie counties.
 : Montgomery County and the Town of Danube in Herkimer County.
  (two seats): Chenango, Broome and Otsego counties.
 : Oneida County and the ex-Oneida part of Oswego County.
 : Herkimer County, except the Town of Danube; and Madison County.
 : St. Lawrence, Jefferson and Lewis counties.
 : Onondaga and Cortland counties, and the ex-Onondaga part of Oswego County.
  (two seats): Tioga, Steuben, Cayuga, Seneca and Tompkins counties.
 : Ontario and Monroe counties.
 : Genesee, Allegany, Niagara, Chautauqua, Cattaraugus, Erie and Livingston counties.

1822 elections 

On April 17, 1822, the New York State Legislature re-apportioned the congressional districts according to the figures of the 1820 United States census. The number of district was increased to 30, creating eight new districts; the number of seats was increased to 34, creating for the first time a triple-seat district, and keeping two double-seat districts.

 : Queens and Suffolk counties.
 : Kings, Richmond and Rockland counties.
  (three seats): New York County.
 : Westchester and Putnam counties.
 : Dutchess County.
 : Orange County.
 : Ulster and Sullivan counties.
 : Columbia County.
 : Rensselaer County.
 : Albany County.
 : Delaware and Greene counties.
 : Schenectady and Schoharie counties.
 : Otsego County.
 : Oneida County.
 : Herkimer County.
 : Montgomery County.
 : Saratoga County.
 : Washington County.
 : Clinton, Essex, Franklin and Warren counties.
  (two seats): St. Lawrence, Jefferson, Lewis and Oswego counties.
 : Chenango and Broome counties.
 : Madison and Cortland counties.
 : Onondaga County.
 : Cayuga County.
 : Tioga and Tompkins counties.
  (two seats): Ontario and Seneca counties.
 : Monroe and Livingston counties.
 : Steuben, Allegany and Cattaraugus counties.
 : Genesee County.
 : Niagara, Chautauqua and Erie counties.

1824 elections 

The geographical area of the congressional districts remained the same as at the previous elections in 1822. Two new counties were created within the 26th district: Wayne County and Yates County.

 : Queens and Suffolk counties.
 : Kings, Richmond and Rockland counties.
  (three seats): New York County.
 : Westchester and Putnam counties.
 : Dutchess County.
 : Orange County.
 : Ulster and Sullivan counties.
 : Columbia County.
 : Rensselaer County.
 : Albany County.
 : Delaware and Greene counties.
 : Schenectady and Schoharie counties.
 : Otsego County.
 : Oneida County.
 : Herkimer County.
 : Montgomery County.
 : Saratoga County.
 : Washington County.
 : Clinton, Essex, Franklin and Warren counties.
  (two seats): St. Lawrence, Jefferson, Lewis and Oswego counties.
 : Chenango and Broome counties.
 : Madison and Cortland counties.
 : Onondaga County.
 : Cayuga County.
 : Tioga and Tompkins counties.
  (two seats): Ontario, Seneca, Wayne and Yates counties.
 : Monroe and Livingston counties.
 : Steuben, Allegany and Cattaraugus counties.
 : Genesee County.
 : Niagara, Chautauqua and Erie counties.

1826 elections 

The geographical area of the congressional districts remained the same as at the previous elections in 1824. Only one new county was created: in the 29th district, Orleans County was split from Genesee County.

 : Queens and Suffolk counties.
 : Kings, Richmond and Rockland counties.
  (three seats): New York County.
 : Westchester and Putnam counties.
 : Dutchess County.
 : Orange County.
 : Ulster and Sullivan counties.
 : Columbia County.
 : Rensselaer County.
 : Albany County.
 : Delaware and Greene counties.
 : Schenectady and Schoharie counties.
 : Otsego County.
 : Oneida County.
 : Herkimer County.
 : Montgomery County.
 : Saratoga County.
 : Washington County.
 : Clinton, Essex, Franklin and Warren counties.
  (two seats): St. Lawrence, Jefferson, Lewis and Oswego counties.
 : Chenango and Broome counties.
 : Madison and Cortland counties.
 : Onondaga County.
 : Cayuga County.
 : Tioga and Tompkins counties.
  (two seats): Ontario, Seneca, Wayne and Yates counties.
 : Monroe and Livingston counties.
 : Steuben, Allegany and Cattaraugus counties.
 : Genesee and Orleans counties.
 : Niagara, Chautauqua and Erie counties.

2002 elections

2010 elections

Obsolete districts
New York's 27th congressional district, obsolete since the 2020 U.S. census
New York's 28th congressional district, obsolete since the 2010 U.S. census
New York's 29th congressional district, obsolete since the 2010 U.S. census
New York's 30th congressional district, obsolete since the 2000 U.S. census
New York's 31st congressional district, obsolete since the 2000 U.S. census
New York's 32nd congressional district, obsolete since the 1990 U.S. census
New York's 33rd congressional district, obsolete since the 1990 U.S. census
New York's 34th congressional district, obsolete since the 1990 U.S. census
New York's 35th congressional district, obsolete since the 1980 U.S. census
New York's 36th congressional district, obsolete since the 1980 U.S. census
New York's 37th congressional district, obsolete since the 1980 U.S. census
New York's 38th congressional district, obsolete since the 1980 U.S. census
New York's 39th congressional district, obsolete since the 1980 U.S. census
New York's 40th congressional district, obsolete since the 1970 U.S. census
New York's 41st congressional district, obsolete since the 1970 U.S. census
New York's 42nd congressional district, obsolete since the 1960 U.S. census
New York's 43rd congressional district, obsolete since the 1960 U.S. census
New York's 44th congressional district, obsolete since the 1950 U.S. census
New York's 45th congressional district, obsolete since the 1950 U.S. census

See also

New York's at-large congressional seat
List of United States congressional districts
List of United States representatives from New York
United States congressional delegations from New York
Elections in New York

References

External links
 New York Congressional Districts (2009), New York Public Library 
 History of the Size Representatives Apportioned to Each State (1st to 23rd Census, 1790–2010), Office of the Historian, U.S. House of Representatives